Celastrus paniculatus is a woody liana commonly known as black oil plant, climbing staff tree, and intellect tree (Sanskrit: jyotishmati ज्योतीष्मती, Hindi: mal-kangani माल-कांगनी, Chinese: deng you teng 灯油藤).

The leaves are simple, broad, and oval, obovate or elliptic in shape, with toothed margins.

Traditional medicine 
Oil from the seeds is used as a traditional medicine in Indian Unani and Ayurvedic medicine.

Poisonous relative
Celastrus paniculatus has a relative that grows in the United States that is poisonous (Celastrus orbiculatus), so identifying this plant carefully can be important.

References

External links
  Contains a detailed monograph on Celastrus paniculatus (Jyotishmati) as well as a discussion of health benefits and usage in clinical practice.
 
 Kanti Rekha, M K Bhan, S S Balyan and A K Dhar: Cultivation prospects of endangered species Celastrus paniculatus Willd.

Celastraceae
Plants used in Ayurveda